Jaime Moreno Morales (born 19 January 1974) is a Bolivian former professional footballer now serving as Youth Academy Technical Training Coach for D.C. United in Major League Soccer, and as the head coach of D.C. United's U-23 side.

Moreno began his career at Club Blooming and then played for Colombia's Independiente Santa Fe before spending two seasons at the English club Middlesbrough. The rest of his career was spent at D.C. United apart from one season at the New York MetroStars in 2003, and he was the all-time leading scorer in Major League Soccer at the time of his retirement in 2010. On 22 August 2007, in a match against the New York Red Bulls, he scored his 109th MLS goal, surpassing the previous league record set by former Dallas Burn and Real Salt Lake forward Jason Kreis. On 17 April 2009, Moreno became the first MLS player ever to reach the mark of 100 goals and 100 assists when he assisted on a Ben Olsen stoppage time goal.

From 1991 to 2008, Moreno played 75 matches for the Bolivia national team, scoring eight goals. He represented the nation in five Copa América tournaments and the 1994 FIFA World Cup.

Club career
Moreno was born in Santa Cruz de la Sierra, Bolivia. He began his career attending the prestigious Tahuichi Academy and playing for Blooming from 1991 to 1994. He signed with the Colombian side Independiente Santa Fe in 1994, but made only five league appearances for the team.

In 1994 Moreno signed with Middlesbrough, and the following season he became the first Bolivian to play in the English Premiership. Moreno started in Middlesbrough's official opening of their new Riverside Stadium in a friendly against Italian side Sampdoria. He spent two years there, mostly coming off the bench. In total he made 20 league appearances for Boro, but only scored one league goal against Barnsley, also scoring another goal against A.C. Cesena in the Anglo-Italian Cup.

In 1996, in the middle of the Major League Soccer season, he was signed by the league and allocated to D.C. United, and helped lead them to the MLS Cup. He was one of the league's best players in 1997, when he led the league in goals (16), was named to the MLS Best XI and won another MLS Cup for his side (he would add a third Cup and another Best XI in 1999). After the 1997 season, he spent a few games on loan back to Middlesbrough, scoring once against Stoke City.

1998 was Moreno's best season, as he scored 16 goals and added 11 assists, only losing the MLS MVP Award to teammate and fellow Bolivian Marco Etcheverry. He continued to play well amid constant concerns about his weight, but injuries began to take toll in 2001. He missed a large chunk of the 2002 season, and a conflict with head coach Ray Hudson led to Moreno being traded to the MetroStars after that season.

Moreno missed most of his one season with the Metrostars, but did score two goals, one against United. He was shipped back to United before the 2004 season and, undertaking a strict training regimen to avoid injuries, regained much of his old form. He was a finalist for MLS MVP, was named to the league's Best XI for the second time, and led D.C. to their fourth MLS Cup. He was named to another Best XI in 2005. He was named to the MLS All-Time Best XI after the 2005 season. In 2007, he scored his 108th goal on a penalty kick against Toronto FC on 19 May, tying him with Jason Kreis as the all-time leading scorer in MLS. Moreno and Steve Ralston are the only players to have played in each of the first 15 MLS seasons. On 12 August 2010, Jaime Moreno and D.C. United announced that the 2010 season would be his last year with the club. His last game was at home against Toronto FC on 23 October 2010, where he scored on a penalty kick.

After the 2010 MLS season D.C. United declined Moreno's contract option and he elected to participate in the 2010 MLS Re-Entry Draft. When he was not selected, Moreno retired as a player and was hired as Youth Academy Technical Training Coach for D.C. United on 4 March 2011.

International career
Moreno was a regular on the Bolivia national team for most of the 1990s and played in the 1994 FIFA World Cup and the 1997 Copa América, but had been ignored for six years until recalled in 2007 for a friendly with Ireland. He played in the 2007 Copa América, where he scored his eighth international goal in the 39th minute of Bolivia's opening game against the host nation of Venezuela. He also scored in the 24th minute against Peru, though it was not enough for Bolivia to advance from the group stage.

Moreno announced his retirement from international football in October 2008, after 75 appearances and nine goals scored for his country. He played in 23 FIFA World Cup qualification matches and at the 1999 Confederations Cup.

Managerial career
D.C. United announced on 1 March 2011 that Moreno had been named the club's Youth Academy Technical Training Coach.

On 5 May 2011; six months after his retirement, Moreno was hired by his former club, D.C. United, to coach their U-23 side. The team represents the highest tier in United's Academy, and will begin playing in the Premier Development League, the fourth division in American soccer in 2012.

Post-playing career
On 14 September 2013, Moreno was inducted into the D.C. United Hall of Tradition at halftime of a match against the Los Angeles Galaxy at RFK Stadium.

On 2 October 2021, Moreno was inducted into the National Soccer Hall of Fame.

Personal life
Moreno and his wife, Louise, reside in Loudoun County, Virginia, with their five children. Moreno's oldest son, James, 15, has been invited to train with Premier League club West Ham as of 20 October 2010.

Career statistics

Club

International
Scores and results list Bolivia's goal tally first, score column indicates score after each Moreno goal.

Honors
D.C. United
 Major League Soccer MLS Cup: 1996, 1997, 1999, 2004
 Major League Soccer Supporter's Shield: 1997, 1999, 2006, 2007
 Lamar Hunt U.S. Open Cup: 1996, 2008
 CONCACAF Champions' Cup: 1998
 Copa Interamericana: 1998

Middlesbrough
 Football League First Division: 1994–95

Individual
 MLS Best XI: 1997, 1999, 2004, 2005, 2006
 MLS Cup MVP: 1997
 National Soccer Hall of Fame: 2021
 MLS All-Time Best XI

References

External links

Most Appearances for Bolivia at rsssf
International statistics at rsssf

Post-Match interview roll after passing Jason Kreis as the top scorer in MLS history, 8/22/07. 

1974 births
Living people
Sportspeople from Santa Cruz de la Sierra
Association football forwards
Bolivian footballers
Bolivia international footballers
Bolivian expatriate footballers
Club Blooming players
Independiente Santa Fe footballers
Expatriate footballers in Colombia
Categoría Primera A players
Middlesbrough F.C. players
Expatriate footballers in England
Premier League players
English Football League players
Expatriate soccer players in the United States
D.C. United players
New York Red Bulls players
Major League Soccer players
1991 Copa América players
1993 Copa América players
1994 FIFA World Cup players
1997 Copa América players
1999 Copa América players
1999 FIFA Confederations Cup players
2007 Copa América players
Bolivian expatriate sportspeople in Colombia
Bolivian expatriate sportspeople in England
Bolivian expatriate sportspeople in the United States
Major League Soccer All-Stars
National Soccer Hall of Fame members